The Joseph Kendall House is a house in southeast Portland, Oregon, that is listed on the National Register of Historic Places.

Further reading

See also
 National Register of Historic Places listings in Southeast Portland, Oregon

References

1884 establishments in Oregon
Houses completed in 1884
Houses on the National Register of Historic Places in Portland, Oregon
Portland Historic Landmarks
Queen Anne architecture in Oregon
Richmond, Portland, Oregon
Romanesque Revival architecture in Oregon